Bruton railway station serves a largely rural area in the county of Somerset in England. The station is situated in the market town of Bruton. Trains on the Reading to Taunton line pass through the station but do not normally stop. Services are operated by Great Western Railway (who also manage the station) and South Western Railway.

History

The station was opened by the Great Western Railway on 1 September 1856 on its Wilts, Somerset and Weymouth main line. At that time this was just a single track but a loop was provided at Bruton to allow trains to pass. Stone buildings were erected on both platforms, and a footbridge linked the platforms from 1895. A signal box was provided from 1877 at the west end of the station.

The goods yard, which was on the north side of the line opposite the signal box, was closed on 5 April 1965 and the station was downgraded to an unstaffed halt from 6 October 1969 under the Western Region of British Railways.

Stationmasters

John George Indermaur 1856 - 1862 (formerly station master at Keynsham)
William Matthew Mitcham 1863 - 1865 (formerly station master at Maiden Newton, afterwards station master at Frome)
William Edward Bock 1865 - 1866 (afterwards station master at Maiden Newton)
Alfred James 1869 - ca. 1871
Walter Titball 1874 - 1882 (formerly station master at Yeovil)
Arthur Percy Dagg 1882 - ca. 1895 (formerly station master at Maiden Newton)
Thomas William Wood from 1898 (formerly station master at Malmesbury)
Herbert Edwin Matthews from 1908  
G.E. Nailor 1925 - 1927 (afterwards station master at Castle Cary)
Godfrey Beaconsfield Taylor ca. 1929 ca. 1931
G. Bennett from 1947  (formerly station master at Hullavington)

W. Wilcox for six years in charge of the goods department at Warminster is reported as being appointed stationmaster in 1888 however, Arthur Dagg is still recorded as station master in the GWR Register of Clerks in 1890 and in the 1891 census.

Facilities
The station has two platforms with a modern glass-and-metal waiting shelter on each. A footbridge enables passengers to cross the line. There is no wheelchair access to the far platform (for trains arriving from Bristol and going to Weymouth). The station has a bike rack and help points.

Location 
The cutting in which the railway is built is a Site of Special Scientific Interest as one of the best places in England to demonstrate the stratigraphic distinction of ammonites in the subcontractus zone and the morrisi zone.

Services

Great Western Railway operates eight trains each way on the Bristol to Weymouth line during the week and five on Sundays. It is not a regular service; there are some gaps of up to three hours between trains.

A faster and more frequent service to London is available at  station from where Great Western Railway operates trains into .

References

External links 
 Bruton - Least Used Station in Somerset, 2018 YouTube film about the station and its status as the station with lowest passenger numbers in Somerset

Railway stations in Somerset
Railway stations in Great Britain opened in 1856
Former Great Western Railway stations
Railway stations served by Great Western Railway
Bruton
Railway stations served by South Western Railway
DfT Category F1 stations